Burning Ice is a Chinese original crime drama television series, adapted from the novel The Untouched Crime by the author Zijin Chen (紫金陈), broadcast on iQiyi in September 2017.

Series summary
Yu Guo, a leading member of a local “Ant Tribe” - a group of radicalized low-income college graduates who set up a rogue community next to farmers, rural migrant workers and laid-off workers - is accidentally drawn into a homicide case through a girl who he is still in love with, but no longer in his life. Hui-ru Zhu, his ex-girlfriend in high school, has become a suspect in a murder investigation and needs his help to clear her name.

Along the same time as Hui-ru Zhu is accused of murder, a group of homicide cases from a decade ago return to the spotlight. The reason: the likeness to a series of gruesome murders linked to a suspect with the online user name of The Snowman. With striking similarities to a string of recent homicides linked to serial killer, and ex-cop, Wen Luo. While Wen Luo has evaded arrest, he has accidentally and intricately become involved in the murder that Zhu Huiru's accused of, by covering up any evidence that might link her and Yu Guo to the crime. For reasons unknown at the time, the past is prologue for Hui-ru Zhu and the weaving story currently unfolding.

Liang Yan, a local crooked-cop who also happens to be the ex-partner to accused serial killer Wen Luo, takes the case as a way to regain trust from the police department. He was demoted for “aggression” and “extra-curricular” activities while on duty, resulting in him losing rank. His captain promises Liang Yan if he solves this case, he will receive full re-instatement and can “write his own ticket” for any job in the department. The problems Liang face as he gets closer to unearthing clues and discovering motive and perpetrators, is how can he go after, and arrest, his ex-partner.

As Yu Guo and Hui-ru Zhu race to clear their names and avoid becoming victims themselves. Their worlds collide with both the real killer and the copycat, who is replicating the infamous The Snowman murders from over a decade ago.  When faced with what to do next - face the crime or leave town to protect themselves – with different parties in chase, looking to implicate them, one obstacle after another is continually thrown into their path.

With only difficult decisions ahead. Do they take the consequences from the police, or the criminals pursuing them? As Hui-ru Zhu and Yu Guo finally close in on the truth, navigating the underworld and the characters that come with it, their future together becomes limited. The bond between them is breaking. When the moment of truth arrives, and no options left, there will be only one choice, sacrifice the other to save their self.
 
Everything becomes clear, as they move to the proper exit, and conclusion.

Characters

Liang YAN (Hao QIN)

Born into a family of detectives with a storied history, Liang was the typical mischievous teenager, at times forgetting who his family was, but always still able to fall into trouble. Under his father's aggressive guidance, and watchful eye, he graduated from the police academy at the top of his class. After a few years on the force, the “rule breaking” attitude from his youth came back. But now directed towards his superiors, Liang was eventually demoted for an “aggressive” behavior coupled with “extra-curricular” activities while on duty. While trying to regain trust from the police department, he stumbles upon a mysterious “cold-case” that has similarities to a killer he has been chasing, who calls himself “The Snowman.  He pursues the theory that they are.

Hui-ru ZHU (Jiajia DENG）

Hui-ru is a woman seeking freedom from her family and hometown, and exit to a calmer life. Beauty, coveted by many women, brought her the wrong type of attention, becoming a catalyst to events that forever change her life. Dragged against her will into a world she doesn’t, and cannot control… bridged together by past relationships with men and a homicide investigation, while under the watchful eye of a serial killer.

Wen Luo (Lu Yao)

A gifted forensic medical examiner and ex-cop, and who also happened to be Liang Yan’s ex-partner in the police force. Many years ago his wife and daughter went missing while he was away on a business trip, and now he is hell-bent on finding out the truth, and revenge towards who is responsible.  Without the bodies or any concrete evidence the police declare it as a missing person case, and consider it closed due to lack of evidence. Not satisfied with the outcome of the investigation, Wen decides to investigate on his own. When an unknown fingerprint, suppressed in the original investigation, is found at his home, he discovers similarities to his case and the infamous Snowman killer.

Yu Guo (Xu Dai)

Yu Guo is a typical member of an “Ant Tribe” - a group of radicalized low-income college graduates – as a college educated graduate trying to find his own place in a city he barely recognizes anymore. Then one day, his already fragile world is turned upside-down when he is accidentally drawn into a homicide case through his ex-girlfriend, who he is still madly in love with. Even though she might not share the same feelings as he does. In a race against time to clear their names, his human nature is challenged as he faces his own demons of greed, vanity and reckless ambition.

Feng-tian Li (Li Ning)

Feng-tian Li is a loner with a dark past. He works as a mortician by day, by night he solves problems for the underworld. From collecting debts, to making sure problems disappear. Hired to collect one debt, he discovers a journal that brings a cash windfall for the people he works for, including answers to his son's suicide. This pulls him into the middle of a complex mystery of murder and deception. While he plots revenge against those responsible for his son's death, it might unexpectedly also lead to the identity of the mysterious serial killer- The Snowman.

Episodes

EP.1 The Snowman Reappears

The mysterious and unsolved “Snowman” murder case rattles the city, with the killer taunting the police with notes saying “Come to catch me” at the crime scenes. With a last hope of breaking the case, the chief calls back the dismissed and rogue detective, Liang Yan. While the local public defender, Yu Guo, has chance reencounter with his high school love, Hui-ru Zhu, as she gets embroiled in a homicide case.

EP.2 A Key Witness

Detective Yan discovers some interesting details about “The Snowman” case while scrutinizing one of the crime scenes. He finds out about a local hoodlum that goes by the name of Blondie, who says he caught a glimpse of the killer.

Without knowing anything about the underworld, local lawyer Yu pays Blondie to act as a mediator for Hui-ru in negotiating with the gangsters. Come the night of the planned meeting and “negotiation”, Yu and Hui-ru accidentally kill Blondie in a struggle for their lives.

EP.3  Mysterious Man

Yu and Hui-ru unravel after the killing of Blondie. A mysterious man appears to help them clean the crime scene, erasing all the evidence of them being there. When Blondie's body is found by the police, Yu and Hui-ru automatically become suspects because they were seen the last people seen with him. Without any concrete proof the police have to let them go.

EP.4  The Snowman Revelation

Without any new evidence or suspects, Detective Yan has no choice but to start over from the beginning. Wen Luo, a former forensic medical examiner, and Yan's ex-partner, enters the picture.

EP.5 Wen’s Past

A series of murders for a missing journal puts the city on edge. The infamous The Snowman killer reappears, and complicates matters for everyone. Murder suspects Zhu Huiru and Guo Yu navigate a world they don't understand.

EP.6 The Detective and the Suspects

Detective Yan makes a bold move. With a surprise encounter between Yu and Hui-ru and Detective Yan that turns into an impromptu interrogation, Yu breaks down. He confesses everything under the extreme pressure of the questioning. Another murder case is reported. Local gangster Bing Zhang is killed by “The Snowman”.

EP.7 Blackmail

Cold blooded thug Feng-tian Li collects debts for local gangsters. Murder suspect Yu's boss, Mr. Jin owes a lot of money to some very bad people. In trying to save himself, Mr. Jin attempts to blackmail his young protégé.

EP.8  Wen meets his ex-partner

Detective Yan gets some unfortunate news about his ex-partner, Wen. Yan comes up with an elicit ruse to trap Wen in one of his lies. It works. Wen confesses to everything, but refuses to provide any evidence.

While Yu finds a way to escape being blackmailed by his boss, he soon realizes that he has become the target of the underworld fixer, Feng-tian Li.

EP.9 And the Final Answer, is…

Feng-tian catches up to Yu.

His ex-partner Wen, who was in police custody, escapes and is now on the run.

Detective Yan comes close to completing the puzzle that is “The Snowman” investigation.

The truth becomes clear for the first time.

EP.10 The Villain

Alongside the series of murders shaking the city, the search for the journal continues.  Survival has Zhu Huiru facing betrayal from those she trusted, as the real killers responsible are revealed. As the end nears, an unlikely partnership helps to make sense on why “The Snowman” killer reappeared.

EP.11 Battle, Alone…

After two long years, Detective Yan is still working the case, as it becomes clear Hui-ru is his last real hope.

As Hui-ru and Yu finally clear their names, and they can finally get married, conflicts and suspicions still remain between them. Hui-ru chooses to believe Detective Yan as she is desperate for the truth about her brother's death. While Yu hires Feng-tian to kill Detective Yan.

EP.12 The Ultimate Answer

Hui-ru tricks Yu into telling her the truth about her brother's death. Feng-tian suddenly reappears, to erase any last links tying him to the recent string of murders.

References

IQIYI original programming
Chinese web series
Chinese crime television series
2017 Chinese television series debuts
Television shows based on Chinese novels
2017 web series debuts